Eusabena monostictalis is a moth in the family Crambidae. It was described by George Hampson in 1899. It is found on Ambon Island in Indonesia as well as Queensland in Australia.

References

Moths described in 1899
Spilomelinae